Ficus daimingshanensis is a plant species native to the Chinese provinces of Guangxi and Hunan. Type locality is Daming Shan, a mountain in Guangxi Province near Dafeng.

Figs are red,  in diameter, borne in the axils of the leaves.

References

Flora of Guangxi
Flora of Hunan
daimingshanensis